Hennesy is a surname. Notable people with the surname include:

 Carolyn Hennesy (born 1962), American actress and writer
 Dale Hennesy (1926–1981), American art director
 Sean Hennesy, American guitarist
 Tom Hennesy (1923–2011), American actor and stuntman

See also
 Hennessy, world-leading cognac house
 Hennessey (disambiguation)